Sergey Mikhaylovich Koliukh (born 27 October 1960 in Voronezh, Russian SFSR, Soviet Union) is a Russian political figure. He has served as mayor of Voronezh since 11 March 2008 on the March 13, 2013.

References

External links
Sergey Koliukh on Voronezh official website

1960 births
Living people
Mayors of Voronezh
People from Voronezh
Russian State Social University alumni
United Russia politicians